Salvadora persica or the toothbrush tree is a small evergreen tree native to India, the Middle East and Africa. Its sticks are traditionally used as a natural toothbrush called miswak and are mentioned by the World Health Organization for oral hygiene use.

Other names include arak, jhak, pīlu, and mustard tree.

Etymology 
The genus was named by the French botanist Laurent Garcin in 1749 after a Spanish apothecary, Juan Salvador y Bosca. The type specimen was collected in Persia, hence the species name persica.

Description

Salvadora persica is a small tree or shrub with a crooked trunk, typically  in height. Its bark is scabrous and cracked, whitish with pendulous extremities. The root bark of the tree is similar in colour to sand, and the inner surfaces are an even lighter shade of brown. It has a pleasant fragrance, of cress or mustard, as well as a warm and pungent taste. The leaves break with a fine crisp crackle when trodden on. The tree produces small red edible fruits, juicy but pungent, in clusters.

Distribution and ecology
The plant is native to the Middle East and Africa, and is found on desert floodplains, riverbanks, and grassy savannahs.

History and use
Salvadora persica stick, known as miswak, is popular for teeth cleaning throughout the Arabian Peninsula, Iranian Plateau, as well as the wider Muslim world. 

The fresh leaves can be eaten as part of a salad and are used in traditional medicine. The flowers are small and fragrant and are used as a stimulant and are mildly purgative.  The berries are small and barely noticeable; they are eaten both fresh and dried. The wood of the Salvadora persica can be used for charcoal and firewood. In Namibia, the mustard bush is used as drought-resistant fodder for cattle. The seeds can be used to extract a detergent oil.

As of 2009, Botanic Gardens Conservation International has a total of eight Salvadora persica plants in conservation.

See also 
 Miswak
 Meswak
 Pilu oil

References

External links 

Fruits originating in Africa
Trees of Africa
Flora of North Africa
Flora of Namibia
Shrubs
Medicinal plants
Salvadoraceae
Taxa named by Carl Linnaeus
Plants described in 1753